Duarte Brás Carneiro Costa Taveiro Machado (born 12 February 1983) is a Portuguese retired footballer who played mainly as right back.

Playing career
Born in Lisbon, Machado played youth football at Sporting CP from ages 15 to 19. He made his senior debut with amateurs União Sport Clube, and went on to compete in the lower leagues until 2006, also representing Casa Pia A.C. and C.D. Olivais e Moscavide and achieving promotion to the Segunda Liga in the latter season.

Until 2013, Machado played almost exclusively in the second tier or Portuguese football, with C.D. Fátima and C.F. Os Belenenses. Whilst with the latter club, he contributed 39 games in the 2012–13 campaign – 38 starts – as it returned to the Primeira Liga after a three-year absence.

Machado made his debut in the top flight on 15 September 2013, playing the full 90 minutes in a 2–1 away loss against Académica de Coimbra. The previous month, still during preseason, he suffered a thigh injury that ruled him out for four weeks.

Machado retired in 2016 at the age of 34, after one season apiece in the second division with S.C. Olhanense and Atlético Clube de Portugal.

Coaching career
Machado started working as a manager shortly after retiring, going on to be in charge of several teams in the lower leagues.

Career statistics

References

External links

1983 births
Living people
Portuguese footballers
Footballers from Lisbon
Association football defenders
Primeira Liga players
Liga Portugal 2 players
Segunda Divisão players
Casa Pia A.C. players
C.D. Olivais e Moscavide players
C.D. Fátima players
C.F. Os Belenenses players
S.C. Olhanense players
Atlético Clube de Portugal players
Portuguese football managers